Barry Cottle (born 1961/1962) is an American businessman, and former CEO of Light & Wonder from June 2018, when he succeeded Kevin Sheehan, until August 2022.

Early life
Cottle earned a bachelor's degree in information services and mathematics from Southwest Missouri State University, and an MBA from the Kellogg School of Management at Northwestern University.

Career
Cottle joined Scientific Games in August 2015, as chief executive, SG Interactive.

In June 2018, Cottle, head of SG Interactive, was named as CEO of the parent company, replacing Sheehan.

In August 2022, Cottle resigned from Light & Wonder.

References

Living people
American chief executives
Missouri State University alumni
Northwestern University alumni
1960s births